John Cannon Bardsley (6 May 1886 – 1971) was an English amateur footballer who made one appearance in the Football League for Everton as a left back.

Personal life 
Bardsley served as a private during the First World War, firstly in the South Lancashire Regiment and latterly at the 2nd Western General Hospital in Manchester with the Royal Army Medical Corps.

Career statistics

References 

1886 births
1971 deaths
English footballers
Footballers from Southport
South Lancashire Regiment soldiers
British Army personnel of World War I
Association football fullbacks
Royal Army Medical Corps soldiers
Northern Nomads F.C. players
Everton F.C. players
Military personnel from Lancashire
Manchester City F.C. players
English Football League players
Wrexham A.F.C. players
Chester City F.C. players